This is a list of Plaid Cymru MPs.  It includes all Members of Parliament elected to the British House of Commons representing Plaid Cymru.  Members of the Welsh Assembly or the European Parliament are not listed.

Dates are taken from a House of Commons Library Briefing. Following a rule change that came into force at the 2005 general election MPs who were defeated (eg Simon Thomas) are shown as serving up to and including the day of the election at which they were defeated. MPs who voluntarily stood down (eg Elfyn Llwyd) are shown as serving up until the day of dissolution of their final Parliament.

Tabular representation

See also
 List of Plaid Cymru MSs

References
Current Plaid Cymru MPs

Specific

 
Plaid Cymru
Plaid Cymru